Davide Marfella (Napoli 15 September 1999) is an Italian professional footballer who plays as a goalkeeper for  club Napoli.

Club career
Formed in the S.S.C. Napoli youth system, Marfella joined to S.S.C. Bari on 24 July 2019.

Career statistics

Club

References

External links 
Profile at the S.S.C. Napoli website
 
 
 

1999 births
Living people
People from Pozzuoli
Footballers from Campania
Italian footballers
Association football goalkeepers
Serie A players
Serie C players
Serie D players
S.S.C. Napoli players
Vis Pesaro dal 1898 players
S.S.C. Bari players